Pedro Nuno Alves Soares Albergaria (born 12 December 1980) is a Portuguese retired professional footballer who played as a goalkeeper.

Club career
Born in Maia, Porto District, Albergaria appeared twice for F.C. Maia in the Segunda Liga in 2003–04 after competing solely in the lower leagues, to where he returned at the end of that season. His most steady spell was lived at F.C. Tirsense, with whom he signed in the summer of 2007 and where he remained five years.

At the end of the 2015–16 campaign, Albergaria helped F.C. Vizela return to the second division after an absence of seven years. His first game in the competition with the club – third overall, at the age of 35 – occurred on 6 August 2016, in a 1–0 away win against Académico de Viseu FC.

International career
Albergaria was part of the Portugal U18 squad at the 1999 UEFA European Under-18 Championship, keeping a clean sheet in the final against Italy as the tournament ended in conquest.

References

External links
 
 
 

1980 births
Living people
People from Maia, Portugal
Portuguese footballers
Association football goalkeepers
Liga Portugal 2 players
Segunda Divisão players
Boavista F.C. players
C.D. Feirense players
Gondomar S.C. players
G.D. Estoril Praia players
F.C. Maia players
C.F. União de Lamas players
F.C. Famalicão players
F.C. Marco players
F.C. Tirsense players
G.D. Ribeirão players
F.C. Vizela players
Portugal youth international footballers
Sportspeople from Porto District